Rui da Silva (15 September 1951 – 5 May 1999) was a Brazilian sprinter. He competed in the men's 100 metres at the 1976 Summer Olympics. He was the older brother of another sprinter, Delmo da Silva. His team came in third place in the 4 × 100 metre relay at the 1977 IAAF World Cup.

References

External links
 

1951 births
1999 deaths
Athletes (track and field) at the 1976 Summer Olympics
Brazilian male sprinters
Olympic athletes of Brazil
Athletes from Rio de Janeiro (city)
Pan American Games medalists in athletics (track and field)
Pan American Games bronze medalists for Brazil
Athletes (track and field) at the 1975 Pan American Games
Athletes (track and field) at the 1979 Pan American Games
Medalists at the 1979 Pan American Games
20th-century Brazilian people